The Venḓa (VhaVenḓa or Vhangona) are a Southern African Bantu people living mostly near the South African-Zimbabwean border.

The history of the Venda starts from the Kingdom of Mapungubwe (9th Century) where King Shiriyadenga was
the first king of Venda and Mapungubwe. The Mapungubwe Kingdom stretched from the Soutpansberg in
the south, across the Limpopo River to the Matopos in the north. The Kingdom declined from 1240, and
power moved north to the Great Zimbabwe Kingdom.
The first Venda settlement in the Soutpansberg was that of the legendary chief Thoho-ya-Ndou (Head of the
Elephant). His royal kraal was called D’zata; its remains have been declared a National Monument. The Mapungubwe Collection is a
museum collection of artefacts found at the archaeological site and is housed in the Mapungubwe Museum in Pretoria. Venda people share ancestry with Lobedu people and Kalanga people. They are also related to Sotho-Tswana peoples Sotho-Tswana and Shona groups. All these tribes were under the Venda kingdom.

History

The Venda of today are Vhangona, Takalani (Ungani), Masingo and others. Vhangona are the original inhabitants of Venda, they are also referred as Vhongwani wapo; while Masingo and others are originally from central Africa and the East African Rift, migrating across the Limpopo river during the Bantu expansion, Venda people originated from central and east Africa, just like the other South African tribes.

The Venda of today are descendants of many heterogeneous groupings and clans such as:
 Dzindou dza Hakhomunala Mutangwe / Dzatshamanyatsha
 Dzindou dza Vharundwa / Dza Mitshetoni /Dza Manenzhe
 Vhafamadi;
 Vhadau vhatshiheni
 Vhadau Madamani
 Rambuda;
 Vha Ha-Ramavhulela (Vhubvo Dzimauli)
 Vhakwevho;
Vha Ha-Maďavha (Great Warthogs of Luonde who immigrated from Zimbabwe) 
 Vhambedzi;
 Vhania;
 Vhagoni;
 Vhalea;
 Gebebe;
Ndou;
Maďou 
Vhasekwa
 Vhaluvhu;
 Vhatavhatsindi;
 Vhalovhedzi
 VhaMese
Vha Ha-Nemutudi
 Vhatwanamba;
 Vhanzhelele/Vhalembethu;
 VhaDzanani
Vhashavhi / VhaLemba 
 Vhanyai;
 Vhalaudzi;
 Masingo; and
 Vhalemba.
 Runganani (marungadzi nndevhelaho)
 Takalani(Ungani)
Vhadau, Vhakwevho, Vhafamadi, Vhania, Vhalea, and Vhaluvhu were collectively known as Vhangona. The Vhangona and Vhambedzi are considered to be the original inhabitants of Venda and the first people to live there.

The land of Vhangona was later settled by Karanga-Rodzvi clans from Zimbabwe: Vhatwanamba, Vhanyai, Vhatavhatsindi, and Vhalembethu. Masingo, Vhalaudzi, and Vhalemba are late arrivals in Venda.

According to one version of Vhangona oral history the capital of Vhangona was Mapungubwe with the Raphulu Royal House as the most senior royal house of the Vhangona. According to this version the Vhangona Kingdom had approximately 145 chiefdoms and a King (Thovhele). It is said that the Kingdom was divided into seven districts:

 Dzanani
 Mbilwi
 Tswime
 Tshiendeulu
 Tshakhuma
 Tshamanyatsha
 Lwamondo

These districts were ruled by District Paramount Chiefs (Mahosi Mahulu), as follows:

 MuDzanani/Nesongozwi (Dzanani)
 Nembilwi (Mbilwi)
 Netswime (Tswime)
 Netshiendeulu (Tshiendeulu)
 Netshakhuma (Tshakhuma)
 Netshamanyatsha (Tshamanyantsha)
 Makhahani (Thulamela)
 NELWAMONDO (Lwamondo)

Each district had Chiefs (Khosi) who paid tribute to Mahosi Mahulu (Paramount Chiefs), then there were Headmen (VhaMusanda) and then Petty Headmen (Vhakoma). This tradition states that one of the Vhangona kings was King Shiriyadenga whose royal kraal was at Mapungubwe. It is not clear if this Shiriyadenga is the same as Shiriyedenga of the Sanga dynasty, a Karanga-Rozvi branch. The Sanga dynasty, in Zimbabwe's eastern highlands, was founded by Chiphaphami Shiriyedenga who died in 1672. Perhaps at one point the Karanga-Rodzvi Empire extended beyond the Vhembe (Limpopo) River, and the Vhangona, though not Karanga-speaking, were at one point under Karanga-Rodzvi rule.

The other version of Vhangona history disputes that the Vhangona were ever united under one chief or king. It says that the Vhangona had different independent chiefdoms and that the Vhangona chief of Nzhelele valley was Tshidziwelele of the Mudau clan. What is clear, however, is that the Vhatwanamba, who were of Karanga-Rodzvi origin, conquered Vhangona clans who lived in Mapungubwe, Musina, Ha-Tshivhula, Ha-Lishivha, Ha-Matshete, Ha-Mulambwane, and Ha-Madzhie (the areas of Ha-Tshivhula, Ha-Lishivha, Ha-Matshete, and Ha-Mulambwane are known today as Alldays and Waterpoort).

Mapungubwe was the center of a kingdom with about 5,000 people living at its center. Mapungubwe as a trade center lasted between 1030 and 1290 AD. The people of Mapungubwe mined and smelted copper, iron and gold, spun cotton, made glass and ceramics, grew millet and sorghum, and tended cattle, goats and sheep.

The people of Mapungubwe had a sophisticated knowledge of the stars, and astronomy played a major role not only in their tradition and culture, but also in their day-to-day lives. Mapungubwe traded with ancient Ethiopia through the ports of Adulis on the Red Sea and the ports of Raphta (now Quelimani) and Zafara (now Sofala) in Mozambique.

Mapungubwe predates the settlements at Great Zimbabwe, Thulamela and Dzata. It is believed that people left Mapungubwe for Great Zimbabwe because Great Zimbabwe was judged to have a more suitable climate.

The Venda were recognised as a traditional royal house in 2010 and Toni Mphephu Ramabulana has been acting king since 2012. In September 2016 Princess Masindi Mphephu, daughter of Tshimangadzi Mphephu (Venda Chief during 1993–1997), challenged her uncle Ramabulana for the throne. She claimed that she wasn't considered a candidate because of her sex.

On 14 December 2016 she initially lost this battle in court when the Thohoyandou High Court dismissed the case.
In May 2019, however, the Supreme Court of Appeal overturned the Thoyoyandou High Court decision and declared that Toni Mphephu-Ramabulana's appointment as king of the Venda nation was unlawful. Ramubulana has since appealed this ruling, and as of July 2020 the matter was before the Constitutional Court of South Africa.

Notable Venda people

The following is a list of notable Venda people who have their own Wikipedia articles
 Cyril Ramaphosa, 5th President of the Republic of South Africa
 Benedict Daswa, South African school teacher beatified by the Roman Catholic Church
Colbert Mukwevho, South African reggae singer 
 Mulalo Doyoyo, South African engineer, inventor, and professor
 E. S. Madima, South African writer
 Mukhethwa Mukhadi, South African singer, rapper, producer and director
 Tenda Madima, South African writer
 Tshilidzi Marwala, Vice-Chancellor of the University of Johannesburg, South African engineer and computer scientist 
 Florence Masebe, South African actress
 Shaun Maswanganyi, South African athlete
 Mark Mathabane, South African tennis player and author of Kaffir Boy 
 Patrick Mphephu, first president of the bantustan of Venda
 Frank Ravele, second president of the bantustan of Venda
 Fulu Mugovhani, South African actress
 Shudufhadzo Musida, Miss South Africa 2020 winner
 Sydney Mufamadi, South African politician
 Gumani Mukwevho, South African politician
 Elaine Mukheli, South African singer and songwriter
 Azwinndini Muronga, South African physicist
 Fulufhelo Nelwamondo, South African engineer and computer scientist
 Faith Muthambi, South African politician
 Phillip Ndou, South African boxer
 Lovemore Ndou, South African-Australian boxer 
 Joel Netshitenzhe, South African politician 
 George Phadagi, South African politician
 Kagiso Rabada, South African cricketer
 Ndivhudzannyi Ralivhona, South African musician
 Joe Mafela, South African actor, film director and singer
 Kembo Mohadi, Vice President of Zimbabwe.
 Mashudu Tshifularo, South African educator and medical specialist 
 Mpho Tshivhase, South African philosopher
 Daniel Mudau, South African footballer
 Khuliso Mudau, South African footballer 
 Rodney Ramagalela, South African footballer
 Prince Neluonde, South African lawn bowler
 Eric Mathoho, South African footballer
 Mbulaeni Mulaudzi, South African middle-distance runner
 Collen Mulaudzi, South African long-distance runner
 Rhoda Mulaudzi, South African footballer
 Gabriel Ramushwana, former head of state of the bantustan of Venda
 Makhado, 19th century King of the Venda people
 Gabriel Temudzani, South African actor
 Jacob Tshisevhe, South African footballer
 Tshifhiwa Munyai, South African boxer 
 Clarence Munyai, South African sprinter
 Marks Munyai, South African footballer
 Fred Phaswana, South African businessman
 Mmbara Hulisani Kevin, South African politician
 Tshilidzi Nephawe, South African basketball player
 Rudzani Ramudzuli, South African footballer
 Richard Ramudzuli, South African Events Organizer

 Michael Masutha, South African politician 
 Rendani Masutha, South African naval officer and former military judge
 Khume Ramulifho, South African politician
 Luvhengo Mungomeni, South African footballer
 Rasta Rasivhenge, South African rugby union referee
 Ernst Oswald Johannes Westphal, Professor of African Languages, b. Khalavha 1919
 Rudzani Maphwanya, South African Army officer
 Riky Rick, South African rapper, songwriter and actor
 Phophi Ramathuba, South African politician and medical doctor
 Khumbudzo Ntshavheni, South African politician
 Mavhungu Lerule-Ramakhanya, South African politician
 Milicent Makhado, South African actress
 Dan Tshanda, South African musician
 Phathutshedzo Nange, South African footballer
 Rotshidzwa Muleka, South African footballer
 Thomas Gumbu, South African politician
Noria Mabasa, Venda artist who works in ceramic and wood sculpture

Musangwe
Musangwe is a Venda tradition of bare-knuckle fist fighting. Musangwe is a sport which was developed not only for entertainment but also for gaining respect among your peers. Vhavenda never allowed violence and fighting, but with this sport you could challenge a person you deemed disrespectful towards you, and the rule is if you are challenged to fight you are to fight or there will be consequences such as a fine or even been beaten up by the elders. The winners of this sport were often compensated with whatever the Khosi (chief) or Vhamusanda (headman) deemed right. The fights have no set time limit and only end when one fighter concedes defeat. No medical staff are on standby to help those injured in the flurry of blows that boxers trade, only village elders watching to guard against indiscretions such as biting or kicking.
Importantly, gambling on the outcome of the fights is banned and the winners take nothing away other than a sense of pride in representing their village or family.

References

 
Articles containing video clips